Equity Bank Tanzania Limited, is a commercial bank in Tanzania, the second-largest economy in the East African Community. It is licensed by the Bank of Tanzania, the country's central bank and national banking regulator. The bank is a member of the Equity Group Holdings Limited, a large financial services  conglomerate, headquartered in Nairobi, Kenya, with subsidiaries in Kenya, Rwanda, South Sudan, Tanzania, Uganda, Democratic Republic of the Congo and a representative office in Ethiopia.

Overview
As of September 2014, Equity Bank Tanzania Limited owned total assets valued at US$143.42 million, with US$107.68 million in customer deposits and a loan book of US$87.1 million. As at 31 June 2016, his bank was the leading originator of mortgage loans in Tanzania, accounting for an estimated TSh 96 billion (approx. US$45 million) in total mortgage loans. At that time this translated in about 20 percent market share of all mortgage loans in the country.

In 2019, Equity Group Holdings Limited began talks to acquire four banks in Tanzania, Rwanda, Zambia and Mozambique from Atlas Mara in a share deal valued at KSh 10.6 billion (US$965 million) where the company had recorded a pre-tax loss of KSh 559 million (US$5.09 million).  The transaction deal was dropped so that Equity Group Holdings Limited could stock their reserves and have cash flow during the COVID-19 pandemic that was being reported worldwide.

By December 2020, Equity Bank Tanzania Limited recorded a total value of $162 million (KSh 17.8 billion) in customer deposits, a loan book worth $138 million( KSh 15.2 million) and asset value worth $259 million (KSh 28.5 billion).

Equity Group Holdings Limited
Equity Group Holdings Limited is a large financial services group in East Africa. , As of August 2021, the group had an asset base valued at over US$10.2 billion (KSh 1.12 trillion), with a total customer base in excess of 14 million.  The companies that comprise the Equity Bank Group include the following:

  Equity Bank Kenya Limited – Nairobi, Kenya 
 Equity Bank Rwanda Limited – Kigali, Rwanda  
 Equity Bank South Sudan Limited – Juba, South Sudan 
 Equity Bank Tanzania Limited – Dar es Salaam, Tanzania  
 Equity Bank Uganda Limited – Kampala, Uganda  
 Equity Banque Commerciale du Congo – Kinshasa, Democratic Republic of the Congo  
 Equity Consulting Group Limited – Nairobi, Kenya 
 Equity Insurance Agency Limited – Nairobi, Kenya 
 Equity Nominees Limited – Nairobi, Kenya 
 Equity Investment Services Limited – Nairobi, Kenya 
 Finserve Africa Limited – Nairobi, Kenya 
 Equity Group Foundation – Nairobi, Kenya 

Shares of the stock of Equity Group Holdings Limited, are listed on the Nairobi Stock Exchange (NSE), under the symbol EQTY. The Group's stock is also cross-listed on the Uganda Securities Exchange (USE), under the symbol EBL.

See also

References

External links
  Website of Equity Bank Tanzania Limited
 Website of Bank of Tanzania

Banks of Tanzania
Banks established in 2012
Companies of Tanzania
Economy of Dar es Salaam
2012 establishments in Tanzania